HMAS Ipswich (FCPB 209), named for the city of Ipswich, Queensland, was a  in the Royal Australian Navy (RAN).

Design and construction

Main propulsion machinery consisted of two MTU series 538 diesel engines, which supplied  to the two propeller shafts. Exhaust was not expelled through a funnel, like most ships, but through vents below the waterline. The ship's company consisted of 22 personnel. Each patrol boat was armed with a single Bofors 40mm gun as main armament, supplemented by two .50 cal Browning machineguns and an 81 mm mortar, although the mortar was removed from all ships sometime after 1988. The main weapon was originally to be two 30 mm guns on a twin-mount, but the reconditioned Bofors were selected to keep costs down; provision was made to install an updated weapon later in the class' service life, but this did not eventuate.

Ipswich was laid down by NQEA in Cairns, Queensland on 29 October 1980, launched on 25 September 1982, and commissioned into the RAN on 13 November 1982.

Operational history
During October and November 2006, Ipswich was the primary ship used for filming the 13-episode Australian television drama series Sea Patrol. Ipswich was rebadged as the fictional HMAS Hammersley (pennant number 202), and spent six weeks operating off Dunk Island with both the show's cast and her normal crew aboard. Footage of Ipswich at sea was mixed with scenes shot on and around sister ship  while the latter was docked in Sydney.

Fate
The two patrol boats were the last of the class in active service. The patrol boat was broken up for scrap in Darwin during 2007, at a cost of $450,000 to the Australian government. The patrol boat's Bofors gun was incorporated into a naval memorial cairn shaped like Ipswichs bow in Queens Park, Ipswich.

Citations

References

 The chapter is available separately as Semaphore, Issue 17, 2005 in PDF and HTML formats.
 

Fremantle-class patrol boats
Ships built in Queensland
1982 ships